An agglutinative language is a type of synthetic language with morphology that primarily uses agglutination. Words may contain different morphemes to determine their meanings, but all of these morphemes (including stems and affixes) tend to remain unchanged after their unions, although this is not a rule: for example, Finnish is a typical agglutinative language, but morphemes are subject to (sometimes unpredictable) consonant alternations called consonant gradation. Despite the occasional outliers, agglutinative languages tend to have more easily deducible word meanings if compared to fusional languages, which allow unpredictable modifications in either or both the phonetics or spelling of one or more morphemes within a word.  This usually results in a shortening of the word, or it provides easier pronunciation.

Overview
Agglutinative languages have generally one grammatical category per affix while fusional languages have multiple. The term was introduced by Wilhelm von Humboldt to classify languages from a morphological point of view. It is derived from the Latin verb agglutinare, which means "to glue together".

Non-agglutinative synthetic languages are fusional languages; morphologically, they combine affixes by "squeezing" them together, drastically changing them in the process, and joining several meanings in a single affix. For example, in the Spanish word comí ("I ate"), the suffix -í carries the meanings of first person, singular number, past tense, perfective aspect, indicative mood, active voice. The term agglutinative is sometimes incorrectly used as a synonym for synthetic, but that term also includes fusional languages. The agglutinative and fusional languages are two ends of a continuum, with various languages falling more toward one or the other end. A synthetic language may use morphological agglutination combined with partial usage of fusional features, for example in its case system (e.g., German, Dutch, and Persian).

Agglutinative languages tend to have a high rate of affixes or morphemes per word, and to be very regular, in particular with very few irregular verbs. For example, Japanese has very few irregular verbs – only two are significantly irregular, and there are only about a dozen others with only minor irregularity; Luganda has only one (or two, depending on how "irregular" is defined); while in the Quechua languages, all the ordinary verbs are regular. Both Georgian and Korean are exceptions; such languages have a significant number of irregular verbs.

Examples 
Examples of agglutinative languages include:
Indigenous languages of the Americas
Algonquian languages
Cree (also classified as polysynthetic)
Blackfoot (partially fusional)
Siouan languages
Iroquoian languages
Cherokee language
Yuchi
Athabaskan languages
Muskogean languages
Quechuan languages
Aymaran languages
Arawakan languages
Tupian languages
Tupi language (Brazil)
Nheengatu (Brazil)
Araucanian languages
Salishan languages
Mesoamerican languages
Nahuatl
Wasteko
Austronesian languages
Tagalog
Malay (partially isolating)
Indonesian (partially isolating)
Sundanese
Javanese
Kapampangan
Ilokano
Pangasinan
Chamorro
Niger–Congo languages
Bantu languages
Berber languages
Dravidian languages
Tamil
Telugu
Malayalam
Tulu
Eskimo–Aleut languages
Aleut
Inuktitut
Yupik
Turkic languages
Turkish
Azerbaijani
Uzbek
Kazakh
Karakalpak
Uyghur
Turkmen
Kyrgyz
Tatar
Yakut
Bashkir
Chuvash
Crimean Tatar
Tuvan
Southern Altai
Karachay-Balkar
Kumyk
Karaim
Tungusic languages
Japonic languages
Japanese
Ryukyuan
Korean
Mongolic languages
Mongolian language
Kalmyk language
Buryat language
Moghol language
Oirat language
Khamnigan language
Languages of the Caucasus
Kartvelian languages
Northwest Caucasian languages
Northeast Caucasian languages
Tibeto-Burman languages
Tibetan (both Classical and Standard)
Mizo
Lai
Burmese
Uralic languages
Sámi languages
Hungarian
Finnish
Estonian
Mordvinic
Komi
Basque (fusional verb morphology)
Munda languages
Santali

Many unrelated languages spoken by Ancient Near East peoples were agglutinative, though none from larger families have been identified:
 Elamite
 Hattic
 Kassite
 Lullubi
Sumerian language

Some well known constructed languages are agglutinative, such as Esperanto, Klingon, Quenya and Black Speech.

Agglutination is a typological feature and does not imply a linguistic relation, but there are some families of agglutinative languages. For example, the Proto-Uralic language, the ancestor of the Uralic languages, was agglutinative, and most descended languages inherit this feature. But since agglutination can arise in languages that previously had a non-agglutinative typology and it can be lost in languages that previously were agglutinative, agglutination as a typological trait cannot be used as evidence of a genetic relationship to other agglutinative languages. The uncertain theory about Ural-Altaic proffers that there is a genetic relationship with this proto-language as seen in Finnish, Mongolian and Turkish.

Many languages have developed agglutination. This developmental phenomenon is known as language drift. There seems to exist a preferred evolutionary direction from agglutinative synthetic languages to fusional synthetic languages, and then to non-synthetic languages, which in their turn evolve into isolating languages and from there again into agglutinative synthetic languages. However, this is just a trend, and in itself a combination of the trend observable in Grammaticalization theory and that of general linguistic attrition, especially word-final apocope and elision.

References

Citations

Sources 

 Bodmer, Frederick. Ed. by Lancelot Hogben. The Loom of Language. New York, W.W. Norton and Co., 1944, renewed 1972, pages 53, 190ff. .

 
Synthetic languages